André Ramalho Silva (born 16 February 1992) is a Brazilian professional footballer who plays as a centre-back for Eredivisie club PSV.

Career

Early career
Ramalho made his league debut on 20 July 2013 against SC Wiener Neustadt. He played the full game. On 27 July 2013, he scored his first goal for RB Salzburg against FK Austria Wien in a 5–1 win. He scored his second goal against SV Grödig at 10 August 2013.

Bayer Leverkusen
Ramalho moved to Bayer Leverkusen on 1 July 2015.

In the 2016-17 Bundesliga he was loaned to Mainz

Red Bull Salzburg
On 3 May 2018, he played in the Europa League semi-finals as Olympique de Marseille played out a 1–2 away loss but a 3–2 aggregate win to secure a place in the 2018 UEFA Europa League Final.

PSV
He signed a three-year contract with PSV on 26 May 2021. This will be the third club where he is under the tutelage of Roger Schmidt, next to Red Bull Salzburg and Bayer Leverkusen.

Career statistics

Honours
Red Bull Salzburg
Austrian Football Bundesliga: 2013–14, 2014–15, 2017–18, 2018–19, 2019–20
Austrian Cup: 2013–14, 2019–20
Regionalliga West (3rd league): 2010–11, 2012–13
PSV

 KNVB Cup: 2021–22
 Johan Cruyff Shield: 2021, 2022
Individual
Austrian  Bundesliga Team of the Year:  2018–19, 2021–22

References

External links

Profile at the PSV Eindhoven website

1992 births
Living people
Association football defenders
Brazilian footballers
Brazilian expatriate footballers
FC Liefering players
FC Red Bull Salzburg players
Bayer 04 Leverkusen players
1. FSV Mainz 05 players
PSV Eindhoven players
Austrian Football Bundesliga players
Bundesliga players
Eredivisie players
Expatriate footballers in Austria
Expatriate footballers in Germany
Expatriate footballers in the Netherlands